Franyeli Margarita Brazobán Germán (born 27 September 1995) is a Dominican footballer who plays as a defender. She has been a member of the Dominican Republic women's national team.

International career
Brazobán capped for the Dominican Republic at senior level during the 2014 Central American and Caribbean Games.

References 

1995 births
Living people
Women's association football defenders
Dominican Republic women's footballers
People from La Vega Province
Dominican Republic women's international footballers
Competitors at the 2014 Central American and Caribbean Games